Catalan Action (AC) was a Catalanist political movement in the first third of the 20th century.

History
AC was created in 1922 around the Catalan National Conference, which brought together elements of the Joventut Nacionalista, the Regionalist League, former members of the Federal Unió Republicana Nacionalista, and independent youth intellectuals. Dissatisfied with the performance of Lliga, rated low by the new nationalist party, the first central committee was formed by Jaume Bofill i Mates, President, Lluis Nicolau d'Olwer, Antoni Rovira i Virgili, Carlos Jordán, Ramon d'Abadal i Vinyals and Leandre Cervera. The daily Advertising, acquired by the new party and fully Catalanised (it was renamed the Publicitat), became his means of expression.

In the first elections in which he participated he achieved excellent results. In the summer of 1923 a pact with Basque and Galician nationalists was signed, called Triple Alliance. In 1927, the most leftist Acció, led by Antoni Rovira i Virgili, left the party to create Acció Republicana de Catalunya.

After the dictatorship of Primo de Rivera, the party was a signatory to the Pact of San Sebastián (1930), represented by Manuel Carrasco Formiguera.  Lluís Nicolau d'Olwer, appointed to the Provisional Government of the Republic, headed into hiding for Niceto Alcalá-Zamora. In March 1931, the party merged with Acció Republicana de Catalunya and became Accio Catalana Republicana.

References

1922 establishments in Spain
1931 disestablishments in Spain
Catalan nationalism
Defunct political parties in Catalonia
Liberal parties in Spain
Political parties disestablished in 1931
Political parties established in 1922
Political parties in Catalonia
Republican parties in Spain
Social liberal parties